Sandakan Municipal Council (abbreviated MPS) is the municipal council which administrates the city and municipalities area of Sandakan in the state of Sabah, Malaysia.

History 
The municipal council is formed in 1982 following the merged between Sandakan Town Board and Rural District Council on 1 January 1982. The title of "Commissioner" was subsequently replaced with "President" while "Employee" becomes "Secretary". On 1 January 1984, Sandakan District Office was abolished by the state government with some of their previous duties and responsibilities were taken over by the municipal council and the former district officer became deputy president of the council. In April 2018, Sabah Minister of Local Government and State Housing Hajiji Noor said that the Cabinet of Sabah has decided to upgrade the status of the municipal council into Sandakan City Council with the plans supposed to take effect on 1 July. However, following the sudden change of government in the 2018 election, the plans unable to become reality. On 4 September 2018, the President of the council was replaced by a new President with focus are given on other matters. Through the statement by Sabah Deputy Chief Minister and Local Government and Housing Minister Jaujan Sambakong on 5 August 2019, the new government will continue the plan to elevating Sandakan's status as the second city in Sabah. In 2021, the 9th Prime Minister  Ismail Sabri Yaakob has pre-launch Sandakan as the second city in Sabah. The Public Works Minister Bung Moktar Radin said that they had planned Sandakan to achieve city status by October 2022.

President of Sandakan Municipal Council (Presiden) 
Since 1982, the town has been led by eleven presidents. The previous presidents are listed as below:

References

External links 

   Sandakan Municipal Council official website

Sandakan
Local government in Sabah
Municipal councils in Malaysia